Bahador Molaei (born March 21, 1992 in Babolsar) is an Iranian weightlifter who won a silver medal at the 2013 Wrocław world championship.

Major results

External links

References

Iranian male weightlifters
Living people
World Weightlifting Championships medalists
1992 births
Weightlifters at the 2014 Asian Games
People from Babolsar
Universiade medalists in weightlifting
Universiade silver medalists for Iran
Asian Games competitors for Iran
Medalists at the 2013 Summer Universiade
Sportspeople from Mazandaran province
21st-century Iranian people